Ab Lashkar-e Vosta (also Romanized as Āb Lashkar-e Vosţá; also known as Āb Lashgar-e Vosţá) is a village in Rud Zard Rural District, in the Central District of Bagh-e Malek County, Khuzestan Province, Iran. At the 2006 census, its population was 32, in 8 families.

References 

Populated places in Bagh-e Malek County